Ilyichi is a rural locality (a village) in Beloyevskoye Rural Settlement, Kudymkarsky District, Perm Krai, Russia. The population was 21 as of 2010. There is 1 street.

Geography 
Ilyichi is located 28 km north of Kudymkar (the district's administrative centre) by road. Kozlova is the nearest rural locality.

References 

Rural localities in Kudymkarsky District